Max Fresson (23 April 1912 – 5 February 1996) was a French equestrian. He competed at the 1948 Summer Olympics and the 1960 Summer Olympics.

References

1912 births
1996 deaths
French male equestrians
Olympic equestrians of France
Equestrians at the 1948 Summer Olympics
Equestrians at the 1960 Summer Olympics
Sportspeople from Paris
20th-century French people